Mir 2 may refer to either: 

Mir-2 (DOS-8, Salyut 9) the never-assembled successor to the Mir space station
 Zvezda (ISS module), the core module for Mir-2, now part of the International Space Station
Mir EO-2, Mir Principle Expedition 2, to the Mir-1 space station
Mir EP-2, Mir Visiting Expedition 2, to the Mir-1 space station
Mir-2 (sub), a Russian DSV submarine
MIR-2 computer, Russian early computers
mir-2 microRNA precursor
The Legend of Mir 2, an MMORPG

See also
 Mir (disambiguation)